Férid Boughedir (born 1944) is a Tunisian film director and screenwriter.

Career
Boughedir has directed five films since 1983. His film Caméra d'Afrique was screened at the 1983 Cannes Film Festival. In 1996, his film Un été à La Goulette was entered into the 46th Berlin International Film Festival. The following year, he was a member of the jury at the 47th Berlin International Film Festival.

Filmography
 Caméra d'Afrique (1983)
 Caméra arabe (1987)
 Halfaouine Child of the Terraces (1990)
 Un été à La Goulette (1996)
 Villa Jasmin (2008)

References

External links

 Les gens du cinéma
 Interview with the director by Giuseppe Sedia at Clapnoir.org - 27 May 2008.
 

1944 births
Living people
Tunisian film directors
Tunisian screenwriters
People from Hammam Lif